Elin "Ella" Dorotea Eklund (later Näsholm, 6 February 1894 – 17 August 1953) was a Swedish diver. She competed in the 1912 Summer Olympics and finished fifth in the 10 m platform event.

References

1894 births
1953 deaths
Swedish female divers
Olympic divers of Sweden
Divers at the 1912 Summer Olympics
Stockholms KK divers
Divers from Stockholm